This is a list of Members of Parliament elected in the 1949 Northern Ireland general election.

All members of the Northern Ireland House of Commons elected at the 1949 Northern Ireland general election are listed.

Members

Changes
1949: Socialist Republican Party dissolved; Harry Diamond thereafter sat as an independent.
24 October 1949: Thomas Charles Nelson elected for the Unionists in Enniskillen, following the resignation of Erne Ferguson.
15 November 1949: Frederick Lloyd-Dodd elected for the Unionists in Queen's University, following the death of William Lyle.
29 November 1949: George Boyle Hanna elected for the Unionists in Belfast Duncairn, following the death of William Grant
20 January 1950: Alexander Hunter elected for the Unionists in Carrick, following the resignation of Lancelot Curran.
4 April 1950: Robert Harcourt elected for the Unionists in Belfast Woodvale, following the death of John William Nixon
31 October 1950: Daniel Dixon elected for the Unionists in Belfast Bloomfield, following the death of Herbert Dixon.
6 December 1950: Charles McGleenan elected for the Anti-Partition League of Ireland in South Armagh, following the death of Malachy Conlon.
2 February 1951: Nat Minford elected for the Unionists in Antrim, following the death of Hugh Minford.
18 June 1951: Edward Warburton Jones elected for the Unionists in City of Londonderry, following the resignation of James Godfrey MacManaway.
10 December 1951: Brian McConnell elected for the Unionists in South Antrim, following the death of John Milne Barbour
31 January 1953: Death of John Maynard Sinclair.

References
Biographies of Members of the Northern Ireland House of Commons

1949